The 2007 U.S. Figure Skating Championships took place between January 21 and 28 at the Spokane Arena and the Spokane Convention Center in Spokane, Washington. Skaters competed in four disciplines – men's singles, ladies' singles, pair skating, and ice dancing – across three levels: senior, junior, and novice. Medals were awarded in four colors: gold (first), silver (second), bronze (third), and pewter (fourth).

The event was used to determine the U.S. teams for the 2007 World Championships, 2007 Four Continents Championships, and 2007 World Junior Championships.

The event was later named the Sports Event of the Year by Sports Travel Magazine.

Notes
 Despite general consensus that the popularity of U.S. figure skating was on the decline, the competition shattered the championships' previous attendance record held by Los Angeles with a crowd of 130,000 in 2002. The new attendance record is now 155,000.
 Kimmie Meissner became the first lady since Barbara Roles to win nationals on the novice (2003), junior (2004), and senior levels. As well, Evan Lysacek won his first senior national title, completing his own novice (1999), junior (2000), and senior national titles set.

Senior results

Men

Ladies

Pairs

Ice dancing

Junior results

Men

Ladies

Pairs

Ice dancing

Novice results

Men

Ladies

Pairs

Ice dancing

International team selections

World Championships

Four Continents Championships

World Junior Championships

References

External links
 2007 United States Figure Skating Championships
 2007 United States Figure Skating Championships full schedule and results
 Event Schedule
 TV Schedule
 USFSA site
 Spokesman-Review coverage, with blogs, video demonstrations, and photos

Sports competitions in Spokane, Washington
United States Figure Skating Championships
U.S. Figure Skating Championships
United States Figure Skating Championships, 2007
U.S. Figure Skating Championships
2007 in sports in Washington (state)